Layne Morgan (born 20 April 1999) is an Australian rugby union and sevens player.

Biography 
Morgan attended St Paul's Catholic College in Booragul, New South Wales. She was selected for the Australian Youth Sevens squad for the 2017 Commonwealth Youth Games in The Bahamas.

On 6 May 2022, she made her international debut for Australia against Fiji. She later played in the test match against Japan.

Morgan was named in Australia's squad for the 2022 Pacific Four Series in New Zealand. She was named in the Wallaroos squad for a two-test series against the Black Ferns at the Laurie O'Reilly Cup. She was selected in the team again for the delayed 2022 Rugby World Cup in New Zealand.

References

External links
Wallaroos Profile

1999 births
Living people
Australia women's international rugby union players
Australian female rugby union players